David Packard Corenswet (born July 8, 1993) is an American actor. After graduating from the Juilliard School in 2016, he began guest starring in television series, including House of Cards in 2018. He then starred in the Netflix series The Politician (2019–2020) and Hollywood (2020), both created by Ryan Murphy, the Netflix movie Look Both Ways (2022), the HBO miniseries We Own This City (2022), and the A24 movie Pearl (2022).

Early life and education
Corenswet was raised in Philadelphia, Pennsylvania. His father, John Corenswet, was from a prominent Jewish family in New Orleans, and worked as a stage actor in New York City for many years before becoming a lawyer; his mother is a lawyer who specializes in nonprofit organizational conflict resolution; his sister is a graduate of the University of Pennsylvania Law School.

Corenswet's maternal grandfather is Edward Packard, inventor of the interactive fiction genre, creator of the Choose Your Own Adventure book concept, and author of more than 50 books in that series. His maternal grandmother was a prominent Quaker activist.

Corenswet graduated from The Shipley School and earned a Bachelor of Fine Arts in drama in 2016 from the Juilliard School in New York City. He applied and was accepted to Juilliard while a freshman at the University of Pennsylvania.

Career
As a child actor, Corenswet appeared in numerous professional theater productions, including the Arden Theatre Company's 2002 production of Arthur Miller's All My Sons, the Philadelphia Shakespeare Festival's 2003 production of Macbeth, the Walnut Street Theatre Company's 2003 production of La Vie En Bleu, and the People's Light and Theatre Company's 2004 production of The Forgiving Harvest, among others.

Corenswet wrote the screenplay for and acted in Following Chase (2011), directed by Greg Koorhan. He next co-wrote, produced, and starred in a two-season sketch-comedy web series, Moe & Jerryweather (2014-2016).

In 2016, director Rob Reiner cast Corenswet as a co-lead in his planned television series, The Tap, set at Yale College in 1969. Corenswet played a student. USA Network ordered the pilot episode, which was filmed in 2017, but declined to pick up the series.

In Corenswet's first film role after graduating from Juilliard, he starred as Michael Lawson in Affairs of State (2018), a political thriller. The film also stars Thora Birch, Mimi Rogers, and Adrian Grenier. Los Angeles Times described the film as "well-acted".

Corenswet then appeared in several guest-star roles, including in House of Cards, Elementary, and Instinct.

In The Politician (2019–2020), he portrays River Barkley, the lover and high-school political rival of Payton Hobart (Ben Platt). Vanity Fair described River as a "wealthy, sporty, straight-A student".

Corenswet stars as Jack Castello in Hollywood (2020), a Netflix limited series about the post-World War II film business in Los Angeles. Corenswet is also an executive producer on the series. He stars alongside Patti LuPone, Dylan McDermott, Darren Criss, and Holland Taylor. Men's Health magazine praised Corenswet's performance as that of a "breakout lead". IndieWire called it "another star-proving turn from David Corenswet."

In We Own This City, a 2022 HBO limited series from The Wire’s writers and executive producers David Simon and George Pelecanos, Corenswet co-stars as the veteran police investigator David McDougall, whose work helps uncover years of corruption in the Gun Trace Task Force of the Baltimore police department. The series is based on actual events that unfolded in 2016.

Corenswet co-stars as Jake in Look Both Ways, a 2022 Netflix original romantic comedy-drama film. Directed by Wanuri Kahiu and written by April Prosser, it also stars Lili Reinhart, Luke Wilson, Andrea Savage, Danny Ramirez, and Aisha Dee.

In Pearl, a 2022 feature film released in theaters by A24 and directed by Ti West, Corenswet co-stars as The Projectionist. Martin Scorsese described the film as “mesmerizing” and “enthrall[ing].”

Corenswet joins Natalie Portman, Moses Ingram, Mikey Madison, and Dylan Arnold in the forthcoming Apple TV+ series Lady in the Lake, directed by Alma Har'el. The series has finished filming, and will debut in 2023.

Corenswet will play the male lead in a pilot from 20th Television, to be filmed in 2023: The Answers, FX’s adaptation of Catherine Lacey's novel of that name. He will play the role of Christopher Skye, a charismatic but troubled movie star involved in an enigmatic, futuristic dating experiment.

Filmography

Film

Television

References

External links

1993 births
21st-century American male actors
American male child actors
American people of Jewish descent
Juilliard School alumni
Living people
Male actors from Philadelphia
Shipley School alumni